The 27th Da'i al-Mutlaq of Ismailism according to the Sulaymanis. His becoming a Dai' as per Nass-e-Shareef of Sayyidna, Dawood Bin Ajabshah led to a schism with a group who did not accept him primarily in India and elsewhere in Arab lands. Those who had not accepted him were called  Dawoodi Bohras. Those who did follow him as per the policy of Nass and Tauqeef are called the Sulaymani Isma'ilis, also referred to as Ahl-e-Haq.

He was born to  Ghair munfarid Dai' Sayyidna Hasan bin Sayyidna Ad-Dai' Yusuf Najmuddin ibn Sulaiman and mother Sayyadatina Zainab binte Moosa, a niece of Sayyidna Yusuf on the 6th of Shawwal 961 Hijri, corresponding Gregorian date, 13 September 1554 AD, in Qasr-e-Sa'daan, Qila-e-Tayba of Qabeela-e-Hamadaan, the city of Sana'a in Today's north Yemen.

At the modest age of 34 years, he was made a Dai' by 26th Dai' Sayyidna Dawood Bin Ajabshah, by the sending of a Nass; encompassing 19 "Nass-e-Shareef" in that One Nass, dictated by his Dai' Sayyidna Dawood Bin Ajabshah and hand-written by Syedna Dawood Bin Qutubshah specifically, who later claimed that Sayyidna Dawood Bin Ajabshah had made a Nass on him. Sulayman bin Hasan died after having consumed pickle in which poison was mixed by his opponents while he went to the court of  Emperor Akbar in the 44th year of his life, to lodge a case of usurp by his opponent Syedna Dawood Bin Qutubshah, on the morning of the 25th of Shahrullah (Shehr-e-Ramadhaan) in 1005 Hijri, corresponding Gregorian date, 11 May 1597 AD, in what is now Lahore, Pakistan. His body was brought back to Ahmedabad, India from Lahore, Pakistan for burial, and he was buried 3–4 months later in Ahmadabaad

Sulayman bin Hassan in the history of the Imāmī-Tāyyībī-Mustā‘līan Makramis 

{| class="" style="float:center; margin: 2ex 0 0.6em 0.5em; width: 8em; line-height:111%;"
!The schematic history of the development of the Ismā'īlī-Imāmī-Mustā‘lī-Makramis under  the authority of Da'i al-Mutlaq Sulayman bin Hassan from other Shī‘ah Muslim sects
|-   
|

References 

Sulaymani Bohras
Indian Muslims
Tayyibi da'is